Attica and Boeotia Prefecture was a prefecture of Greece.

History
Attica and Boeotia Prefecture was first established in 1833, abolished in 1836 and split up into Attica and Boeotia, and reconstituted in 1845. The prefecture was split up again into separate Attica and Boeotia prefectures in the 1899 reform, but this was reversed in 1909. The prefecture finally ceased to exist in 1943, when it was again split up into Attica and Boeotia (FEK 223Α/26-7-1943). In 1909 the provinces of the prefecture were: Attica province, Aegina province, Megaris province, Livadia province and Thiva province (Thebes Province). The capital of the prefecture was Athens.

1833 establishments in Greece
1943 disestablishments in Greece
Prefectures of Greece
History of Central Greece
States and territories established in 1833
States and territories disestablished in 1943